FC Nantes won Division 1 season 1979/1980 of the French Association Football League with 57 points.

Participating teams

 Angers SCO
 SEC Bastia
 Bordeaux
 Stade Brest
 Stade Lavallois
 RC Lens
 Lille
 Olympique Lyonnais
 Olympique de Marseille
 FC Metz
 AS Monaco
 AS Nancy
 FC Nantes Atlantique
 OGC Nice
 Nîmes Olympique
 Paris Saint-Germain FC
 AS Saint-Etienne
 FC Sochaux
 RC Strasbourg
 US Valenciennes-Anzin

League table

Promoted from Division 2, who will play in Division 1 season 1980/1981
 Auxerre: Champion of Division 2, winner of Division 2 group B
 FC Tours: Runner-up, winner of Division 2 group A

Results

Relegation play-offs

|}

Top goalscorers

References

 Division 1 season 1979-1980 at pari-et-gagne.com

Ligue 1 seasons
French
1